Prusias is a genus of huntsman spiders that was first described by Octavius Pickard-Cambridge in 1892.

Species
 it contains four species, found in Peru, Brazil, Panama, and Mexico:
Prusias brasiliensis Mello-Leitão, 1915 – Brazil
Prusias lanceolatus Simon, 1897 – Brazil or Peru
Prusias nugalis O. Pickard-Cambridge, 1892 (type) – Mexico, Panama
Prusias semotus (O. Pickard-Cambridge, 1892) – Panama

See also
 List of Sparassidae species

References

Araneomorphae genera
Sparassidae
Spiders of North America
Spiders of South America
Taxa named by Octavius Pickard-Cambridge